Gabriel 'Biel' Medina Piris (born 22 March 1980 in Mahón, Menorca, Balearic Islands) is a Spanish former professional footballer who played as a central defender.

External links

1980 births
Living people
People from Mahón
Spanish footballers
Footballers from Menorca
Association football defenders
Segunda División players
Segunda División B players
Tercera División players
CE L'Hospitalet players
SD Eibar footballers
Gimnàstic de Tarragona footballers
CD Leganés players
Lleida Esportiu footballers
Cypriot First Division players
Anorthosis Famagusta F.C. players
Spanish expatriate footballers
Expatriate footballers in Cyprus
Spanish expatriate sportspeople in Cyprus